Product is the debut compilation album by Scottish electronic music producer Sophie. It was released by Numbers on 27 November 2015. Four of the eight songs on Product have appeared on singles released by Numbers from 2013 to 2015. The album was made available in "silicon bubble cases", and its release coincides with the launch of a line of apparel and a "silicon product" resembling a sex toy.

On 25 September 2019, Numbers announced that the album was being re-released in limited quantities in its original format of four vinyl singles, each in a PVC case.

Critical reception

Product received positive reviews, The review aggregator website Metacritic gave the album an average score of 74 out of 100, which indicates "generally favourable reviews". Exclaim! senior editor Stephen Carlick called the record "a snapshot of an exciting artist whose tightrope walk between sweet and scary, pop and avant-garde, has yielded some of the best singles of the past few years." The Observer described the album as "disruptive, a sound pushing the limits of what constitutes pop and what is just an annoying noise you are inexplicably paying money for." Sasha Geffen of Consequence of Sound wrote that "Product blurs the traditional subject/object power relationship of pop music, bending desire as easily as it bends waveforms," and called it "one of the more mischievous music objects under the current atmosphere."

MP3 blog Gorilla vs. Bear listed the album as their 12th best album of 2015.

Track listing

Charts

References

2015 compilation albums
Sophie (musician) albums
Albums produced by Sophie (musician)
Electronic dance music compilation albums
Rave albums